Triggerfinger may refer to:
Trigger finger, a common disorder characterized by catching, snapping or locking of the involved finger flexor tendon, associated with dysfunction and pain
Triggerfinger (band), a Belgian rock band
Triggerfinger (album), an album by Belgian rock band Triggerfinger
"Triggerfinger" (song), a song by Donkeyboy
"Triggerfinger" (The Walking Dead), an episode of the television series The Walking Dead
Trigger Fingers (1924 film), a silent American film
Trigger Fingers (1939 film), an American film
Trigger Fingers (1946 film), an American film